Bert "Bozo" Jackson was an American baseball second baseman in the Negro leagues. He played with the Indianapolis ABCs/Detroit Stars, Atlanta Black Crackers, Philadelphia Stars, and Homestead Grays from 1933 to 1945.

References

External links
 and Baseball-Reference Black Baseball stats and Seamheads

Atlanta Black Crackers players
Indianapolis ABCs (1931–1933) players
Philadelphia Stars players
Homestead Grays players
Year of birth missing
Year of death missing
Baseball second basemen